Miljeno (Cyrillic: Миљено) is a village in the municipality of Čajniče, Republika Srpska, Bosnia and Herzegovina.

References

Populated places in Čajniče